Salih Muslim Muhammad (Kurmanji) is the co-chairman of the Democratic Union Party (PYD), the main party of the Autonomous Administration of North and East Syria. As the deputy coordinator of the National Coordination Committee for Democratic Change, he is the most prominent Kurdish representative for much of the Syrian civil war.

Political career

Early political activities 

Muslim first became involved with the Kurdish movement during the 1970s when he was studying engineering at Istanbul Technical University after becoming influenced by Mustafa Barzani's ongoing fight against the Iraqi government, the failure of which spurred him into becoming more active.

In 1998, he joined the Kurdistan Democratic Party of Syria (KDP-S), the Syrian branch of the Iraqi Kurdish Democratic Party (KDP). He left the KDP-S in 2003 after becoming disillusioned by the party's failure to accomplish its objectives.

Democratic Union Party (PYD) 

In 2003, Muslim joined the newly formed Democratic Union Party (PYD), becoming a member of its executive council, and was elected as party head in 2010. After he and his wife Ayşe Efendi were imprisoned in Syria, he fled to a Patriotic Union of Kurdistan (PUK) camp in Iraq in 2010. He returned to Qamishli in March 2011, following the beginning of the Syrian Civil War.

Under Muslim's chairmanship, the PYD became the leading political party and actor in the emergence of the Autonomous Administration of North and East Syria. In July 2013, during the Kurdish-Turkish peace process, he was invited to Istanbul to negotiate with the Turkish government about the future of Syria, returning on three more occasions for talks between then and October 2014.

TEV-DEM foreign relations 

In September 2017, the 7th congress of the PYD was held in Northern Syria, where two new co-chairs were elected. Muslim since works as the foreign relations official of the Movement for a Democratic Society (TEV-DEM) coalition of the Democratic Federation of Northern Syria.

In this capacity, Muslim has stressed the message that "the Kurdish problem in Turkey and the Kurdish problem in Syria are two separate issues and will be resolved separately. To solve our problem in Syria, we have to sit down and talk with our fellow Syrians, with Arabs, Turkmens and others. Not with Turkey."

Salih was re-elected co-chairman of the PYD alongside Asya Abdullah on June 20, 2022 during the party's 9th congress.

Personal life 

Muslim, a citizen of Syria, was born in a Syrian village close to Kobani in 1951. After an education in Syria, he studied at the Chemical Engineering faculty of Istanbul Technical University from 1970 until graduating in 1977. After a brief stint in London,  he worked in Saudi Arabia between 1978 and 1990, and opened an engineering office in 1993 in Aleppo.

On 9 October 2013, Salih Muslim's son Shervan, a fighter in the People's Protection Units (YPG), was killed west of Tell Abyad during clashes with the then-al-Qaeda-linked Islamic State of Iraq and the Levant. He was buried in the family's hometown of Kobanê in a public funeral which thousands of people attended.

According to Muslim himself, he has permission to reside in Finland.

Muslim can speak Kurdish, English, Arabic and Turkish.

Relations with foreign countries

Europe 

Muslim is a familiar face in European capitals where he is hosted by senior officials. He is a frequent guest and speaker at European political institutions and events, inter alia in September 2016 invited to address the European Parliament.

Addressing thousands during the Newroz celebration in Frankfurt, Germany, on 18 March 2017, Muslim said that "there is a huge resistance despite all the attacks. Nobody should doubt that the success and victory will be ours." Muslim criticised Germany for banning Kurdish symbols, saying that "Germany should have banned the flags of Turkey and terrorist groups instead of our flags and symbols because we are fighting in the Middle East not for ourselves alone, we are fighting ISIS and terrorism for all humanity. Our resistance is for Europe, for the West and for all humanity."

Turkey 

Between 2012 and 2015, Muslim was Ankara’s top interlocutor within the PYD's Syrian Kurdish movement, which was inspired by former Kurdistan Workers' Party (PKK) leader Abdullah Ocalan. During an interview with BBC News reporter Orla Guerin in August 2012, Muslim denied any "operational links" to the PKK. Turkey has received Salih Muslim for talks in 2013 and in 2014, even entertaining the idea of opening a Rojava representation office in Ankara "if it's suitable with Ankara's policies." However, following June 2015 AKP electoral loss in Turkey, largely due to the raise of Kurdish HDP party, the Solution process (2013-2015) collapsed in July 2015, drastically changing the course of AKP relations to the Kurdish issue. According to the pro-administration Daily Sabah, "As a reconciliation process with the PKK was ongoing between 2012 and 2015, Ankara tried to persuade the PYD to drop its hostile attitude toward Turkey, open cooperation channels and to end its affiliations with the Bashar Assad regime. As the PKK unilaterally resumed armed attacks in July 2015, the PYD and its armed wing, the People's Protection Units (YPG), provided the PKK with militants, explosives, arms and ammunition. Simultaneous armed revolts broke out in almost all towns and cities bordering Syria; whereas terrorists trained in northern Syria staged suicide attacks in Turkish cities." The Turkish government allegedly sought to assassinate Muslim. In late 2016, Turkey issued an arrest warrant for Salih Muslim in a move considered putting Ankara on a collision course with its Western allies. On 14 February 2018, two days after Muslim was placed on the "most wanted terrorists" list by the Turkish Interior Ministry and had a bounty of 4 million Turkish lira (about $1.5US millions at the time) placed on his head, he held a press conference at the seat of European Union institutions in Brussels. He was briefly detained at Turkey’s request on 25 February 2018 in Prague, the capital of the Czech Republic, but was released 2 days later, drawing angry protests from Turkey. On 17 March 2018, the Czech authorities dismissed Turkey's request.

In a February 2018 interview, Muslim said that "when I look back, I conclude that Turkey was never sincere about wanting to make peace with the Kurds. Had Turkey reached out to the Kurds, worked with the Kurds, it would have become the most powerful country in the Middle East."

References

External links
 Video | Salih Muslim Muhammad | Full Q&A | Oxford Union | January 2017

People of the Syrian civil war
Living people
1951 births
Syrian Kurdish politicians
Articles containing video clips
Democratic Union Party (Syria) politicians
Syrian Kurdish people
Istanbul Technical University alumni
Rojava politicians